Sandy McAllister (c. 1878 – 31 January 1918) was a Scottish footballer who played for Sunderland as a central defender.

Club career
He made his debut for Sunderland against Stoke City on 20 February 1897 in a 4–1 win. at Newcastle Road. He won the English Football League Championship with Sunderland in 1902. He made 211 appearances and scored 5 goals in his Sunderland career.

Personal life
Before playing football, McAllister worked as a coal miner. During the First World War, he served as a private in the Northumberland Fusiliers. He died of food poisoning in January 1918 while serving in Italy. McAllister is buried at Giavera British Cemetery.

References

1870s births
Footballers from Kilmarnock
Scottish footballers
Sunderland A.F.C. players
English Football League players
1918 deaths
Association football wing halves
Kilmarnock F.C. players
Derby County F.C. players
Oldham Athletic A.F.C. players
Spennymoor United F.C. players
British Army personnel of World War I
Scottish military personnel
Royal Northumberland Fusiliers soldiers
Scottish miners
British military personnel killed in World War I
Deaths from food poisoning